Burren Gold is a Gouda style Irish cheese made from pasteurised cows milk. The cheese is made at the Aillwee Cave in Ballyvaughan in County Clare  and the rounds are waxed by hand. The cheese is available in a number of flavours: Plain, Cumin,  Nettles and Garlic, Black Pepper, Piri Piri and Smoked.

Awards
In 2009 at the Listowel food fair, Burren Gold won all three awards in the "Best Flavour Added Cheese" category. The Gold was awarded to Black pepper, Silver to Oak smoked, and Bronze to Cumin seed.

See also

 List of cheeses
 List of smoked foods

References

Cow's-milk cheeses

Irish cheeses